This is a list of the complete squads for Series XX of World Rugby Sevens for men's teams.

Captains for a tournament have their jersey numbers marked in bold.

Argentina 
Coach: Santiago Gómez Cora

Australia 
Coach: Tim Walsh

Canada 
Coach:
 Damian McGrath (the first eight tournaments, concluding at Singapore)
 Henry Paul (interim)

England 
Coach: Simon Amor

Fiji 
Coach: Gareth Baber

France 
Coach: Jérôme Daret

Japan
Coach: Kensuke Iwabuchi

Kenya 
Coach: Erick Ogweno

New Zealand 
Coach: Clark Laidlaw

Samoa 
Coach: Gordon Tietjens

Scotland 
Coach:
 John Dalziel (to Singapore)
 Scott Forrest (interim)

South Africa 
Coach: Neil Powell

Spain 
Coach: Pablo Feijoo

United States 
Coach: Mike Friday

Notes
 At Singapore, the United States had a late injury to Martin Iosefo which ruled him out of the team. Ben Broselle was elevated to the twelve. Pat Blair joined the squad as the thirteenth man.

Wales 
Coach: Richie Pugh

Non-core teams
One place in each tournament of the series is allocated to a national team based on performance in the respective continental tournaments within Africa, Asia, Europe, Oceania, and the Americas.

Chile
Coach: Edmundo Olfos

Hong Kong
Coach: Paul John

Ireland
Coach: Anthony Eddy

Portugal
Coach: Diogo Mateus

Tonga
Coach: Tevita Tu'ifua

Zimbabwe
Coach: Gilbert Nyamutsamba

See also
 2018–19 World Rugby Women's Sevens Series squads

References

Squads
World Rugby Sevens Series squads